The Vice-President of the Executive Council of New South Wales is a position in the Australian state of New South Wales governments, whose holder acts as presiding officer of the Executive Council of New South Wales in the absence of the Governor.

The Vice-President of the Executive Council is appointed by the Governor on the advice of the Premier. The Vice-President is usually a senior minister and may summon executive councillors and preside at Council meetings when the Governor is not present. However, the Vice-President cannot sign Executive Council documents on behalf of the Governor. The current Vice-President of the Executive Council is Damien Tudehope, since 21 December 2021.

Duties and history
As the duties of the post are not rigorous, it is usually given to a government minister who holds another portfolio. In this sense, it is usually not a 'Minister without portfolio' such as the equivalent position, Lord President of the Council, is in the United Kingdom, although it has sometimes been used thus in the past, particularly in the pre-Federation period. Since 1920 it has typically been given to the Leader of the Government in the Legislative Council or its chief representative.

Vice-presidents of the Executive Council

 
Ministers are members of the Legislative Council unless otherwise noted.

Notes

References

External links
NSW Government Directory - Current ministers

Ministers of the New South Wales state government